The 1948 La Flèche Wallonne was the 12th edition of La Flèche Wallonne cycle race and was held on 21 April 1948. The race started in Charleroi and finished in Liège. The race was won by Fermo Camellini.

General classification

References

1948 in road cycling
1948
1948 in Belgian sport
La Fleche Wallonne